Asselineau is a French surname. Notable people with the surname include:

 Charles Asselineau (1820-1874), French writer
 François Asselineau (born 1957), French politician and civil servant
  (born 1965), French ice hockey player
  (1808-1889), French painter 
 Roger Asselineau (1915-2002), French scholar and writer 

French-language surnames